Eugene Henry Pennell (16 January 1911 – 31 March 2002) was a Canadian sailor who competed in the 1956 Summer Olympics.

References

1911 births
2002 deaths
Canadian male sailors (sport)
Olympic sailors of Canada
Sailors at the 1956 Summer Olympics – Star